Aarthie Ramaswamy (born 28 June 1981) is a chess player from India. She was awarded the title Woman Grandmaster (WGM) by FIDE in 2003.

In 1993, Ramaswamy won the India under-12 girls championship. In 1995, she won the under-14 and under-16 girls championships. In 1998 and 1999, she won the under-18 girls national title. Also in 1999, Ramaswamy won the Girls U18 section of the World Youth Championships, held in Oropesa del Mar, Spain. In 2001, she competed in the Women's World Chess Championship. Ramaswamy won the Indian women's championship in 2003, edging out S. Vijayalakshmi on tiebreak.

She is married to Indian chess grandmaster R. B. Ramesh.

References

External links

1981 births
Living people
Chess woman grandmasters
Indian female chess players
World Youth Chess Champions
20th-century Indian women
20th-century Indian people